Estoniadiscus is an extinct genus of animal of unknown classification, possibly belonging to Bilateria, from the Early Cambrian (Nemakit-Daldynian–Atdabanian) of Estonia. Originally described as a species of Scenella in 1888a, it was redescribed as a possible stem-brachiopod in 2003.

References 

Fossils of Estonia
Fossil taxa described in 2003
Bilaterian genera